Horst Bagdonat is a German rower, who competed for the SC Dynamo Berlin / Sportvereinigung (SV) Dynamo. He won the medals at the international rowing competitions.

References 

Living people
World Rowing Championships medalists for East Germany
East German male rowers
Year of birth missing (living people)